Pseudocatharylla polyxena is a moth in the family Crambidae. It was described by Stanisław Błeszyński in 1964. It is found in Malawi, Mozambique, Tanzania and Zambia.

References

Crambinae
Moths described in 1964